The Santa Maria River (Portuguese, Rio Santa Maria) is a river of Rio Grande do Sul state in southern Brazil. It joins the Ibicuí-Mirim River to form the Ibicuí River.

See also
List of rivers of Rio Grande do Sul

References

Brazilian Ministry of Transport

Rivers of Rio Grande do Sul
Santana do Livramento